The Amalia Tuff is a geologic formation exposed in and around Questa, New Mexico. It has a radiometric age of 25.39 ± 0.04 million years, corresponding to the Oligocene epoch.

Description
The tuff appears to be a single cooling unit.

The tuff is silicic and alkaline, though its silica content of 77-80% likely reflects some secondary silicification. It contains 10-20% quartz and alkali feldspar phenocrysts. Rare occurrences of a vitrophyric tuff at the base of the main bed contain ferrohedenbergite and fayalite, while the upper beds sometimes preserve sodic amphibole phenocrysts. This contains up to 5% andesite and sparse Proterozoic rock fragments. This grades into the main bed of the formation.

Ar-Ar dating of the tuffs and associated plutons indicates the magma that formed the tuff was not generated in place in the upper crust. Isotope evidence suggests the original basaltic magma assimilated considerable crust material and underwent crystal fractionation at a deeper level of the crust than that of the magma chamber responsible for the Questa eruption.

History of investigation
The unit was first designated the Amalia Formation in 1956 by P.F. McKinlay.  As originally defined, it included basalt flows and sedimentary beds dating from before the Questa eruption. These were removed from the unit definition by Lipman in 1983, who restricted the unit to the densely welded tuff outflow sheet from the Questa eruption and renamed the unit the Amalia Tuff.

Footnotes

References 
 
 
 
 
 
 

Paleogene formations of New Mexico